Lohan is a surname. Notable people with the surname include:

 Aliana Lohan (born 1993), American fashion model and former television personality, singer and actress
 Brian Lohan (born 1971), Irish sportsman
 Dina Lohan (born 1962), television personality and occasional actress
 Frank Lohan (born 1974), Irish sportsperson
 Lindsay Lohan (born 1986), American actress and pop singer
 Michael Lohan (born 1960), ex-husband of Dina Lohan and the father of Lindsay, Michael Lohan Jr., Ali, and Cody Lohan
 Neddy Lohan (died 1820), Irish captain of the Whiteboys
 Sinéad Lohan, Irish singer and songwriter of folk music and folk-inspired popular music

Other uses
 Arhat, luohan or lohan in Chinese contexts
 Lohan, Pakistan, a village in the Narowal District of Punjab province
 Lohan (river), a tributary of the Crasna in Vaslui County, Romania
 Lohan, a fictional city from the 1999 PlayStation game The Legend of Dragoon

Surnames of Irish origin
Anglicised Irish-language surnames